Vasily Shcherbakov (Vasily Fyodorovitch Shcherbakov; Born June 19, 1969) is a Russian pianist, professor and composer.

Vasily Shcherbakov is a Candidate of Pedagogic Sciences (2010), a professor and the Director of the Piano Department of the Moscow State University of Culture and Arts, a docent of the Moscow Conservatory, a docent of the "Piano, Organ" Department M. Ippolitova-Ivanova Moscow State Music and Pedagogy Institute. Until 2013 he was also a music teacher of the Moscow College of Music and Theatre Arts #61.

Vasily Shcherbakov is a grand-nephew of the Russian composer Dmitry Kabalevsky and one of the leading performers and popularisers of Kabalevsky's music in the world.

Biography 

Vasily Shcherbakov was born in Moscow in 1969.

His father, Fyodor Shcherbakov (Fyodor Anatolyevitch Shcherbakov) was a Candidate of Geographic Sciences, an Oceanologist, a Geologist, a Geographist, a Lithologist, and a senior research fellow of the Lithology and Marine Geology sub-Department of the Geology Department of Moscow State University as well as a senior research fellow of the Oceanology Institute of the USSR Academy of Sciences (currently known as Shirshov Institute of Oceanology).

His mother, Marina Shcherbakova (Marina Nikolaevna Shcherbakova) is a Gandidate of Geologic and Mineralogic Sciences, a senior research fellow of the Lithology and Marine Geology sub-Department of the Geology Department of Moscow State University with an honourable status given by the University.

Vasily Shcherbakov studied classical music from his early age. He graduated from the state school No. 875 in Moscow. He joined the Moscow Conservatory in 1989 and studied in the class of Prof. Elena Richter until 1994 when he graduated with excellence (magna cum laude).

Currently he performs at various locations around Russia and the world, teaches at the Moscow State University of Culture and Arts, at the Moscow Conservatory and at the M. Ippolitova-Ivanova Moscow State Music and Pedagogy Institute, and gives lectures and master classes.

Music 

Vasily Shcherbakov performs multiple concerts every year at various locations in Russia and around the globe.
Most notable scenes include the Moscow Conservatory, the Moscow International House of Music, the Tomsk Oblast State Philharmonic, the Perm Krai Philharmonic, Donzdorf Castle (Donzdorf, Germany), Richmond Music School (Richmond, British Columbia, Canada), Immanuel Baptist Church (Vancouver, British Columbia, Canada), and the Mirabell Palace (Salzburg, Austria).

He participates in organising and running multiple state-wise and international music festivals, and he's often being invited to be a part of music competitions' jury. He played a role in such events as:

 "Assembly in Mikhailovskoye" ("Assambleya v Mikhailovskom") (Pushkinskiye Gory, Russia);
 "International Shostakovich Chamber Music Competition" (Russian: "Международный конкурс камерных ансамблей им. Д. Д. Шостаковича в Москве", "Mejdunarodniy konkurs kamernyh ansambley imeni D. D. Shostakovicha v Moskve") (Moscow, Russia);
 "DSCH, Dmitri Shostakovich International Festival of Chamber Ensembles" ("DSCH, Mezhdunarodny festival kamernyh ansambley imeni D. D. Shostakovicha v Moskve") (Moscow, Russia);
 "Playing Music Together With Friends" (Dobele, Latvia);
 "ClaviCologne" (Cologne, Germany);
 "Malta International Music Festival" (Malta);
 "International Guitar Festival of the Island of Re; Festival Romantic Nights" (Island of Re, France);
 "Slobozhanska Fantasy" ("Slobozhanskaya fantasia") (Sumy, Ukraine);
 "The 1st CAU International Piano Conference & Festival" (Seoul, South Korea);
 "SALZBURG = MOZART International Chamber Music Competition 2014" at Yamaha Ginza (Tokyo, Japan);
 "Kabalevsky Fest 2014" (Prague, Czech Republic; Moscow, Russia; Salzburg, Austria; Vienna, Austria);

Vasily Shcherbakov performs solo or as a part of a chamber ensemble. Previous chamber performances included, in addition to a piano, on various occasions, instruments such as strings, wind instruments, a theremin, an organ as well as vocal. Vasily Shcherbakov experimented with audio-visualisations.

During his performances he collaborates with a number of musicians, music ensembles and composers, most notably with the Zagreb Quartet, a French guitarist Philippe Villa, a Russian theremin performer Lydia Kavina, a Russian singer and Meritorious Artist of Russia and of Ukraine Alexander Tsilinko, a Russian violinist and Meritorious Artist of Russia Alexander Trostyansky, a Russian-Luxembourger violinist Alena Baeva, an Austrian violinist Luz Leskowitz and with the "Salzburg Soloists" ensemble.

Occasionally Vasily Shcherbakov makes an appearance on Russian radio and TV-channels on the shows designated to classical music.

The performances of Vasily Shcherbakov are well received by listeners, critics, musicians and composers.

Kabalevsky 

Vasily Shcherbakov plays an important role in popularising the works of his grand-uncle Dmitry Kabalevsky. He often includes compositions written by Kabalevsky in his programs. Some of Kabalevsky's works were premiered by the musician.

He serves as a head of jury of the "Kabalevsky Open International Music Competition" ("Otkrytyi Moskovsky mezhdunarodny konkurs imeni D. B. Kabalevskogo").

He received a Candidate of Pedagogic Sciences title in 2010 by protecting a thesis based on Kabalevsky's works in pedagogy.

Vasily Shcherbakov is the president and a co-founder of the non-commercial Kabalevsky Fund founded in 2013. The fund is designated to promote professional music education, music culture and art.

Discography 

Vasily Shcherbakov recorded and published two studio albums under the Moscow-based Classical Records label.

 2005 — Kabalevsky. 24 preludes. Sonata no.3
 2007 — Three Centuries of Piano

Family 

Vasily Shcherbakov is married to Anna Shcherbakova (Anna Iosifovna Shcherbakova) who is a Doctor of Pedagogic Sciences, a Doctor of Culturology, and the Director of the Art and Social Culture Department of the Russian State Social University. Anna Shcherbakova occasionally takes part as a master of ceremonies for Vasily Shcherbakov concerts. She is also one of the co-founders of the Kabalevsky Fund.

References 

1969 births
Living people
Russian classical pianists
Male classical pianists
21st-century classical pianists
Moscow Conservatory alumni
Musicians from Moscow
20th-century classical pianists
20th-century Russian male musicians
21st-century Russian male musicians